Río de la Mina may refer to:

 Río de la Mina (Río Grande, Puerto Rico)
 Río de la Mina (Coamo, Puerto Rico)

See also
 Las Minas (disambiguation)